Malaysia participated in the 2019 Southeast Asian Games from 30 November to 11 December 2019. The Malaysian contingent consist of 773 athletes, competing in 52 out 56 sports.

Medal summary

Medal by sport

Medal by date

Medalists

References

Southeast Asian Games
2019
Nations at the 2019 Southeast Asian Games